Billy Zver  (stage name)  (born 1987 in Kavadarci, SR Macedonia, SFR Yugoslavia) is a Macedonian rapper that together with Gjoko Taneski, represented Macedonia in the Eurovision Song Contest 2010 with the song "Jas ja imam silata".

References

External links 
Billy Zver official MySpace 
Billy Zver official Website

1983 births
Living people
21st-century Macedonian male singers
Macedonian rappers
People from Kavadarci